Günter Schlipper (born 13 August 1962) is a retired German footballer who played as a midfielder. He made 37 appearances in the Bundesliga for Schalke 04 and 1. FC Köln as well as 168 matches in the 2. Bundesliga for MSV Duisburg, Rot-Weiß Oberhausen and Schalke.

References

External links 
 

1962 births
Living people
German footballers
Association football midfielders
Bundesliga players
2. Bundesliga players
MSV Duisburg players
Rot-Weiß Oberhausen players
1. FC Köln players
FC Schalke 04 players
Sportspeople from Oberhausen
Footballers from North Rhine-Westphalia